ECLASS (formerly styled as eCl@ss) is a classification system for products and services. It is maintained by  industry consortium ECLASS e.V. association.

Use 
ECLASS supports the digital exchange of product descriptions and service descriptions, based on standardized data formats based on IEC 61360. It is used in engineering tools as base for transfer of planning data, in ERP systems as base for product master data, and as base for exchange of product data.

Structure 

The ECLASS classification system is based on a hierarchical grouping of products and services. There are 4 levels of hierarchy:
 Segments,
 Main group,
 Group,
 Sub-group or product class.

This classification provides a grouping from point of view of purchasing.

A product class has a 1:1-relation to an application class. Application classes are described in further details with properties according IEC 61360. This approach separates the definition of the classification hierarchy from the definition of the product descriptions.

Standards 
The ECLASS dictionary is based on international standards.
 The data model is defined according IEC 61360/ISO 13584-42.
 The identifiers of the classes and properties are based on ISO 29002-5.
 The release process follows ISO 22274.

Versioning 
The ECLASS e.V. association publishes regularly new versions of the ECLASS dictionary. Different versions of the ECLASS dictionary may differ in regard to defined classes and properties.

In order to support the update of product data, which are based on ECLASS, additional files are published for each version, that support automatized migration of product data.

See also 
 Webpage of ECLASS e.V. association
 ECLASS structure
 ECLASS-Wiki

References 

Product classifications